Pierre Ducasse (born August 18, 1972) is a Canadian politician and New Democratic Party (NDP) activist.

He grew up in Sept-Îles, Quebec, and studied at Université Laval. A party member since age 17, he was appointed interim associate president of the federal party in 2000, and was elected to the post at the NDP convention in Winnipeg in November 2001.

2003 NDP leadership election

In January 2003, he became the first francophone Quebecer to run for the federal leadership of the party. Although he placed fifth among the six candidates, his campaign was widely acclaimed for raising the profile of the NDP in Quebec and vice versa. Ken Georgetti, president of the Canadian Labour Congress, endorsed him prior to the first ballot.

Jack Layton, the Quebec-born winner of the leadership election, appointed Ducasse to be the party's Quebec lieutenant and official spokesman in Quebec.  Ducasse held the post of Quebec lieutenant through two elections until the spring of 2007 when he was replaced by Thomas Mulcair, a former Member of the National Assembly of Quebec and Quebec cabinet minister.

Federal elections
Ducasse was the NDP candidate for the riding of Manicouagan three times, first in the federal election of 1997, and then in the 2004 and 2006 federal elections. In 2008, Ducasse was the NDP candidate in the riding of Hull-Aylmer.

In 2004, Ducasse finished third in Manicouagan, in a race won by Gérard Asselin of the  Bloc Québécois. In 2006, again in Manicouagan, Ducasse placed fourth, but improved his overall result to 4,657 votes or 12.8%. Ducasse received his best result to date in 2008 in Hull-Aylmer, where he placed third with 10,424 votes, for 19.83% of all votes cast in the riding. Liberal Marcel Proulx won the riding with 19,747 votes, or 37.47%, while Bloc Québécois candidate Raphaël Déry finished in second with 11 635 votes, or 22.07%.

In 2011, when he might have run again in Hull-Aylmer, Ducasse and Nycole Turmel started having discussions where he learned Turmel might be interested in running. Ducasse ultimately decided not to run "because she is a fantastic person and candidate, and I just had a baby."

On September 29, 2014 Ducasse declared his intention to seek the federal NDP nomination in Manicouagan a fourth time, challenging incumbent NDP MP Jonathan Genest-Jourdain. He withdrew his candidacy a month later when the party confirmed that the nomination meeting would be held on November 6, 2014, declining Ducasse's request that the meeting be delayed to a later date. Ducasse stated that scheduled meeting date had not allowed him enough time to recruit support.

2009 municipal election
Ducasse ran the 2009 Gatineau municipal election on November 1 of that year. He ran for Gatineau City Council in the Hull–Val-Tétreau District. He lost however, to two-term incumbent Denise Laferrière. The district is centred in Downtown Hull.

Quebec provincial politics
Ducasse became the leader of record of the New Democratic Party of Quebec following its re-founding on January 30, 2014. He announced that he would not be a candidate in the leadership election to be held in January 2018.

Electoral record (partial)

References

External links
 
 Ducasse's speech to the leadership convention
 Ducasse's Ecodema website

1972 births
Canadian Union of Public Employees people
Candidates in the 2004 Canadian federal election
Candidates in the 2006 Canadian federal election
Candidates in the 2008 Canadian federal election
Living people
New Democratic Party candidates for the Canadian House of Commons
People from Sept-Îles, Quebec
Quebec candidates for Member of Parliament
Quebec CCF/NDP leaders
Quebec lieutenants
Université Laval alumni
Trade unionists from Quebec